RydC is a bacterial non-coding RNA. RydC is thought to regulate a mRNA, yejABEF, which encodes an ABC transporter protein. RydC is known to bind the Hfq protein, which causes a conformational change in the RNA molecule. The Hfq/RydC complex is then thought to bind to the target mRNA and induce its degradation.

See also 
RyfA RNA
RydB RNA
RybB RNA

References

Further reading

External links 
 

Non-coding RNA